Bolshoye Spitsino is a rural locality (a village) in Dobryansky District, Perm Krai, Russia. The population was 1 as of 2010. There are 2 streets.

Geography 
Bolshoye Spitsino is located 58 km east of Dobryanka (the district's administrative centre) by road. Golubyata is the nearest rural locality.

References 

Rural localities in Dobryansky District